LSN may refer to:

 Large-scale NAT in computer networking
 Law Society of Nunavut
 Learning and Skills Network, a former UK organisation
 Lenguaje de Signos Nicaragüense, Nicaraguan Sign Language
 Livingston North railway station, Scotland; National Rail station code
 Log sequence number in a transaction log
 Los Banos Municipal Airport, California, US, IATA code